Cyperus croceus, commonly known as Baldwin's flatsedge, is a species of sedge that is native to parts of North America, Central America, and South America.

The species was first formally described by the botanist Martin Vahl in 1805.

See also
List of Cyperus species

References

croceus
Taxa named by Martin Vahl
Plants described in 1805
Flora of Alabama
Flora of Arkansas
Flora of the Bahamas
Flora of Bermuda
Flora of Colombia
Flora of Costa Rica
Flora of Delaware
Flora of Cuba
Flora of Florida
Flora of Georgia (U.S. state)
Flora of Guatemala
Flora of Guyana
Flora of Haiti
Flora of Honduras
Flora of Jamaica
Flora of Kentucky
Flora of Louisiana
Flora of Maryland
Flora of Mexico
Flora of Mississippi
Flora of Missouri
Flora of New Jersey
Flora of Nicaragua
Flora of North Carolina
Flora of Oklahoma
Flora of Panama
Flora of Peru
Flora of Puerto Rico
Flora of South Carolina
Flora of Suriname
Flora of Tennessee
Flora of Texas
Flora of Venezuela
Flora of Virginia
Flora of West Virginia